Fournival is a commune in the Oise department, located in northern France.

Transport 

The D55 and D101 roads pass through the commune. There is a train station in the neighbouring commune Saint-Remy-en-l'Eau.

See also
Communes of the Oise department

References

Communes of Oise